12-Crown-4, also called 1,4,7,10-tetraoxacyclododecane and lithium ionophore V, is a crown ether with the formula C8H16O4. It is a cyclic tetramer of ethylene oxide which is specific for the lithium cation.

Synthesis 
12-Crown-4 can be synthesized using a modified Williamson ether synthesis, using LiClO4 as a templating cation:

 (CH2OCH2CH2Cl)2 + (CH2OH)2 + 2 NaOH → (CH2CH2O)4 + 2 NaCl + 2 H2O

It also forms from the cyclic oligomerization of ethylene oxide in the presence of gaseous boron trifluoride.

Properties 

Like other crown ethers, 12-crown-4 complexes with alkali metal cations. The cavity diameter of 1.2-1.5 Å gives it a high selectivity towards the lithium cation (ionic diameter 1.36 Å)

Its point group is S4. The dipole moment of 12-crown-4 varies with solvent and temperature. At 25 °C, the dipole moment of 12-crown-4 was determined as 2.33 ± 0.03 D in cyclohexane and 2.46 ± 0.01 D in benzene.

References

 Sigma-Aldrich Handbook of Fine Chemicals, 2007, page 768.
 Sigma-Aldrich Cyclic tetramer of ethylene oxide which is specific for the lithium cation. 98%, 2018

See also
Crown ether
Cyclen, a similar molecule with N atoms (aza groups) instead of O atoms (ethers)

Crown ethers